Terry Keane (1939 – 1 June 2008), born in Guildford, UK, was an Irish social columnist and fashion journalist.

Life
Born Ann Teresa O'Donnell in Guildford, Surrey, UK in 1939, Keane studied medicine at Trinity College, Dublin. She dropped out without taking a degree and later married a young barrister, Ronan Keane. The couple separated in the 1990s, and Ronan Keane went on to become Chief Justice.

Career
Keane spent the majority of her career working for the top-selling Irish newspaper, the Sunday Independent, where she was the principal contributor of the Sunday Independent's long-running gossip column, The Keane Edge.

Charles Haughey
In the Keane Edge column there were often hints of a relationship with a prominent political figure, named in the column as Sweetie, and her relationship was apparently widely known in certain circles, though never openly confirmed. Keane left the paper on bad terms after selling the story of her 27-year affair with former Taoiseach Charles Haughey to the British newspaper The Sunday Times, a rival to the affiliated London Independent newspapers, though she admitted her affair on The Late Late Show in 1999.

Death
Keane's death on 1 June 2008 after a long illness was announced by her son-in-law, media gardener Diarmuid Gavin. She is survived by her children Jane, Madeleine and Justine; her son Tim died in 2004.  One of her granddaughters, Holly Carpenter, was Miss Ireland in 2011.

References

External links
The Times - Obituary

1939 births
2008 deaths
Irish columnists
Sunday Independent (Ireland) people